Bob DeMeo (July 22, 1955 – February 12, 2022) was an American jazz drummer.

Biography
DeMeo became a studio musician with Blue Note Records in the early 1980s. His first recordings were made in New York City with Artie Simmons and The Jazz Samaritans. He accompanied artists such as George Benson, Nancy Wilson, and Jon Hendricks. He then moved to Paris, where he worked alongside Michel Graillier and Hal Singer for ten years. Between 1980 and 1997, he was involved in six recording sessions with Julie Monley, Kerem Görsev, and Eric Revis. He also produced recordings with the Sedition Ensemble and Bobby Few. Upon his return to New York, he often performed at Smalls Jazz Club in a quartet alongside Grant Stewart, and Tyler Mitchell.

DeMeo died on February 12, 2022, at the age of 66.

References

External links
 

1955 births
2022 deaths
American jazz drummers
Musicians from New York City